Palpifer taprobanus is a moth of the family Hepialidae. It was described by Frederic Moore in 1887 and is found in Sri Lanka.

The species was once classified as being the same species as Palpifer sexnotatus. In The Fauna of British India, Including Ceylon and Burma: Moths Volume I, George Hampson noted the species collectively as follows:

References

Moths described in 1887
Hepialidae